On September 18, 1921, 16-year-old Eugene Daniel was lynched for walking into a white girl's bedroom.

Lynching  

He walked into a neighbors house and startled a white girl, Gertrude the daughter of homeowner Walter Stone. Eugene Daniel quickly ran away but on Saturday, September 17, 1921, a bloodhound was acquired from Raeford, North Carolina. The hound tracked Daniel down and he was arrested. That night a mob formed and over-powered jailer W.H. Taylor and seized him from the jail where he was being held. Near the Moore Springs Bridge on the old Raleigh road, he was lynched using an auto chain and the body was riddled with bullets. The dangling body became a tourist attraction for white residents and on Monday, September 19, 1921, 1,000 people trekked to see it. 

In the 1970s, the area was submerged with water from the creation of Jordan Lake.

Red Summer

Two years earlier there were several incidents of civil unrest in the so-called American Red Summer of 1919. Terrorist attacks on black communities and white oppression in over three dozen cities and counties. In most cases, white mobs attacked African American neighborhoods. In some cases, black community groups resisted the attacks, especially in Chicago and Washington DC. Most deaths occurred in rural areas during events like the Elaine Race Riot in Arkansas, where an estimated 100 to 240 black people and 5 white people were killed. Also in 1919 were the Chicago Race Riot and Washington D.C. race riot which killed 38 and 39 people respectively. Both had many more non-fatal injuries and extensive property damage reaching into the millions of dollars.

National memorial 

Featured among other things, is a sculpture by Kwame Akoto-Bamfo of a mother with a chain around her neck and an infant in her arms. On a hill overlooking the sculpture is the Memorial Corridor which displays 805 hanging steel rectangles, each representing the counties in the United States where a documented lynching took place and, for each county, the names of those lynched. At the memorial there are six lynching victims in Chatham County between the years 1885 and 1921:
Harriet Finch, Jerry Finch, Lee Tyson, John Pattishall - September 30, 1885, the group was lynched for allegedly being axe murderers. Harriet Finch is 1 of only 4 lynchings of women to occur in North Carolina. 
Henry Jones - January 12, 1899, Jones was lynched after being accused of raping and murdering Nancy Welch/Welsh, a white widow in Chatham County in January 1899.
Eugene Daniel

Bibliography 
Notes

References

 
 
 

 

 
1921 deaths
1921 murders in the United States 
Lynching deaths in North Carolina
People from Jones County, Georgia 
People murdered in North Carolina
1921 crimes in the United States 
1921 in North Carolina
1921 riots in the United States 
Jones County, Georgia
African-American history of North Carolina 
Riots and civil disorder in North Carolina
White American riots in the United States
Racially motivated violence against African Americans 
History of North Carolina